Rhadinothamnus rudis is a small shrub with needle-shaped, angular branchlets and single white flowers at the end of branches.  This species and the three subspecies are endemic to Western Australia.

Description
The stamens marginally shorter than the petals. Flowering occurs from January to December.

Taxonomy
This species was first formally described in 1845 by Friedrich Gottlieb Bartling and he gave it the name Phebalium rude, the description was published in Lehmann'sPlantae Preissianae. In 1998 Paul G. Wilson changed the name to Rhadinothamnus rudis and published the name change in the journal Nuytsia.

There are three subspecies described by Paul Wilson and accepted by the Australian Plant Census:

Distribution and habitat
Rhadinothamnus rudis is found growing on hills and plains in clay, sand, rocky soils, limestone, laterite and quartzite from Albany to Esperance on the south coast of Western Australia.

Subspecies rudis occurs near the south coast between Point Irwin and Cape Arid often growing over limestone on plains and gravelly hillside. Flowers throughout the year.
Subspecies amblycarpus grows on the south coast, more inland from Nyabing in the east to Esperance. Flowers sporadically throughout the year.
Subspecies linearis grows in the Russell Range on shallow, sandy soils over quartzite or granite. Flowers throughout the year.

References

Zanthoxyloideae
Flora of Western Australia
Taxa named by Paul G. Wilson